Kamen station is a station in the city of Kamen in the German state of North Rhine-Westphalia. It is on the Dortmund–Hamm railway.

The line has only two tracks through Kamen, although quadruplication is planned, but its realisation is far away. Kamen station is an architectural monument built by the Cologne-Minden Railway Company in 1847. It was extensively refurbished in the late 1990s as part of a project called Internationale Bauausstellung (international building exhibition) Emscher Park and a bike parking area (one of the first in North Rhine-Westphalia) was built.

Services
It is served on weekdays by four Regional-Express services, NRW-Express (RE 1), Rhein-Emscher-Express (RE 3), Rhein-Weser-Express (RE 6) and Rhein-Hellweg-Express (RE 11), each running hourly.

References

Railway stations in North Rhine-Westphalia
Railway stations in Germany opened in 1847
1847 establishments in Prussia
Buildings and structures in Unna (district)